New Guards Group is an Italian contemporary luxury fashion production and distribution holding company co-founded in Milan, Italy in 2015 by Claudio Antonioli, Davide De Giglio and Marcelo Burlon.

History
The company was founded in 2015 by co-founders, Claudio Antonioli, Davide De Giglio and Marcelo Burlon.

In December 2017, the company acquired an undisclosed stake in knitwear label, Alanui.

In March 2018, Anna Blessmann fashion label, A Plan Application, joined the company with graphic artist Peter Saville.

In March 2019, Peggy Gou joined the roster of labels with her new clothing line, Kirin.

In August 2019, Farfetch purchased the group for a total of US$675 million.

Companies
 Marcelo Burlon County of Milan
 Off-White c/o Virgil Abloh
 Palm Angels
 Unravel Project
 Heron Preston
 A Plan Application
 Alanui
 Kirin by Peggy Gou
 Opening Ceremony
 Ambush

References

External links
 

Retail companies established in 2015
Clothing companies established in 2015
2010s fashion
Clothing retailers of Italy
Companies based in Milan